Hüseyin Aktaş (25 March 1941 – 26 July 2012) was a Turkish long-distance runner. He competed in the marathon at the 1968 Summer Olympics and the 1976 Summer Olympics.

References

1941 births
2012 deaths
Athletes (track and field) at the 1968 Summer Olympics
Athletes (track and field) at the 1976 Summer Olympics
Turkish male long-distance runners
Turkish male marathon runners
Olympic athletes of Turkey
People from Erzincan
Mediterranean Games bronze medalists for Turkey
Mediterranean Games medalists in athletics
Athletes (track and field) at the 1963 Mediterranean Games
20th-century Turkish people
21st-century Turkish people